Ratby railway station served the village of Ratby, Leicestershire, England, from 1832 to 1928 on the Leicester and Swannington Railway.

History
The station was opened as Ratby Lane on 18 July 1832 by the Leicester and Swannington Railway. Its name was changed to Ratby on 26 April 1833. Services were reduced to Saturdays only on 24 December 1847 due to reconstruction of the line but they were restored on 27 March 1848. The station was resited to the west of the level crossing in 1873. It closed on 24 September 1928.

References

Transport in Leicester
Disused railway stations in Leicestershire
Former London and North Western Railway stations
Railway stations in Great Britain opened in 1832
Railway stations in Great Britain closed in 1873
Railway stations in Great Britain opened in 1873
Railway stations in Great Britain closed in 1928
1832 establishments in England
1928 disestablishments in England